The following is a list of titles won by the National Rugby League club, the Wests Tigers, since their inception in 2000.

Premierships
The Wests Tigers won the 2005 NRL Grand Final.

Finals appearances
The Wests Tigers have made three top-eight appearances.

World Club Challenges
The Wests Tigers participated in one World Club Challenge in February 2006.

Rugby League World Sevens
The Wests Tigers won the final Rugby League World Sevens in 2004, taking home prize money of $100,000. This was the first title won by the merged club.

References

Honours
Rugby league trophies and awards
National Rugby League lists
Sydney-sport-related lists